Ballads by Cobb is an album by saxophonist Arnett Cobb recorded in 1960 for the Moodsville label.

Reception

Allmusic awarded the album 3 stars.

Track listing 
 "Willow Weep for Me" (Ann Ronell) - 7:14  
 "Hurry Home" (Buddy Bernier, Bob Emmerich. Joseph Meyer) - 4:46  
 "P.S. I Love You" (Gordon Jenkins, Johnny Mercer) - 5:07  
 "Blue and Sentimental" (Count Basie, Mack David, Jerry Livingston) - 5:21  
 "Darn That Dream" (Eddie DeLange, Jimmy Van Heusen) - 4:47  
 "Why Try to Change Me Now?" (Cy Coleman, Joseph McCarthy) - 2:49  
 "Your Wonderful Love" (Al Fields, Timmie Rogers) - 3:17

Personnel 
 Arnett Cobb - tenor saxophone
 Red Garland - piano, celeste
 George Duvivier - bass
 J. C. Heard - drums

References 

Arnett Cobb albums
1960 albums
Albums produced by Esmond Edwards
Albums recorded at Van Gelder Studio
Moodsville Records albums